Acanthocarpus is a genus in the family Asparagaceae, subfamily Lomandroideae, in the APG III system of classification. It has been difficult to place at family rank, being placed at various times in Dasypogonaceae as well as the Asparagaceae. The entire genus is endemic to the State of Western Australia.

Species include: 
Acanthocarpus canaliculatus A.S.George
Acanthocarpus humilis A.S.George
Acanthocarpus parviflorus A.S.George
Acanthocarpus preissii Lehm.
Acanthocarpus robustus A.S.George
Acanthocarpus rupestris A.S.George 
Acanthocarpus verticillatus A.S.George

Formerly included species:
Acanthocarpus fimbriatus - Chamaexeros fimbriata 
Acanthocarpus mucronatus - Lomandra mucronata  
Acanthocarpus serra - Chamaexeros serra

References

 
Asparagaceae genera
Endemic flora of Australia
Taxa named by Johann Georg Christian Lehmann